Gelder (also known as Goldūr) is a village in Peyghan Chayi Rural District, in the Central District of Kaleybar County, East Azerbaijan Province, Iran. At the 2006 census, its population was 93, in 18 families.

References 

Populated places in Kaleybar County